Slobodan Santrač (1 July 1946 – 13 February 2016) was a Serbian football manager and player. He is the all-time top scorer of the Yugoslav First League with a total of 218 goals, as well as the top scorer in the history of OFK Beograd. As manager, Santrač reached the knockout stage at the 1998 FIFA World Cup with FR Yugoslavia.

Club career
Born in Koceljeva, Santrač grew up in Gornji Milanovac, starting out at local club Takovo. He moved with his family to Valjevo in 1958 and soon joined Radnički, which merged into Metalac Valjevo in 1959. Due to his promising performances in the Serbian League, Santrač was transferred to Yugoslav First League club OFK Beograd in the summer of 1965. He spent nine seasons with the Romantičari, totaling 244 league appearances and scoring 169 goals. During that time, Santrač was the Yugoslav First League top scorer on four occasions (1968, 1970, 1972, and 1973). He also won the Yugoslav Cup in 1966, scoring a brace in the final against Dinamo Zagreb.

In 1974, after completing his mandatory military service, Santrač moved abroad and joined Swiss club Grasshoppers. He was their best scorer in both seasons during his stay with them, before returning to OFK Beograd near the end of the 1975–76 season. Santrač was transferred to Partizan in the winter of 1978, winning the league just a few months upon arriving at the club. He spent two more seasons with the Crno-beli, before switching to Yugoslav Second League side Galenika Zemun in the 1980–81 season as part of the deal for Dragan Mance. With 19 goals in 1981–82, Santrač helped the team win promotion to the top flight for the first time ever. He retired from playing in 1983.

International career
Despite being a prolific scorer during his entire club career, Santrač never established himself at international level, making just eight friendly appearances (only 110 minutes played) for Yugoslavia between 1966 and 1974. His first cap for the national team came on 1 June 1966 in a 2–0 loss to Bulgaria and his only goal later that month against Sweden, in a game that ended in a 1–1 draw.

Managerial career
In December 1994, Santrač started his managerial career at the helm of the national team of FR Yugoslavia, while the country was still under UN sanctions. He served as their manager for almost four years, qualifying the team for the 1998 FIFA World Cup. Later on, Santrač moved to China and took charge of Shandong Luneng, winning the double in 1999. He was also manager of Saudi Arabia (2001), and Macedonia (2005).

Death
Santrač died of a heart attack on 13 February 2016 at the age of 69.

Career statistics

Club

International

Managerial

Honours

Player
OFK Beograd
 Yugoslav Cup: 1965–66
Partizan
 Yugoslav First League: 1977–78
 Mitropa Cup: 1977–78
Galenika Zemun
 Yugoslav Second League: 1981–82
Individual
 Yugoslav First League Top Scorer: 1967–68, 1969–70, 1971–72, 1972–73
 European Bronze Shoe: 1971–72

Manager
Shandong Luneng
 Chinese Jia-A League: 1999
 Chinese FA Cup: 1999
Individual
 Chinese Football Association Coach of the Year: 1999

References

External links
 
 
 

1998 FIFA World Cup managers
Association football forwards
Beijing Renhe F.C. managers
Chinese Super League managers
Expatriate football managers in China
Expatriate football managers in North Macedonia
Expatriate football managers in Saudi Arabia
Expatriate footballers in Switzerland
FK Budućnost Valjevo players
FK Partizan players
FK Zemun players
Grasshopper Club Zürich players
Guangzhou City F.C. managers
North Macedonia national football team managers
OFK Beograd players
People from Koceljeva
Qingdao Hainiu F.C. (1990) managers
Saudi Arabia national football team managers
Serbia and Montenegro expatriate football managers
Serbia and Montenegro expatriate sportspeople in China
Serbia and Montenegro expatriate sportspeople in North Macedonia
Serbia and Montenegro expatriate sportspeople in Saudi Arabia
Serbia and Montenegro football managers
Serbia and Montenegro national football team managers
Serbian expatriate football managers
Serbian expatriate sportspeople in China
Serbian football managers
Serbian footballers
Shandong Taishan F.C. managers
Swiss Super League players
Yugoslav expatriate footballers
Yugoslav expatriate sportspeople in Switzerland
Yugoslav First League players
Yugoslav footballers
Yugoslav Second League players
Yugoslavia international footballers
1946 births
2016 deaths